West High School  may refer to:

United States

West High School (Phoenix, Arizona), a former high school, 1949–1983
West High School (Bakersfield, California)
West High School (Torrance, California)
West High School (Colorado), Denver, Colorado
West High School (Sioux City, Iowa)
West High School (Waterloo, Iowa)
West High School (Minneapolis, Minnesota), a former high school (1908-1982)
West High School (Kansas City, Missouri), a former high school (closed 1981), now an apartment building
West High School (Akron, Ohio), a former high school that became first a junior high school and then apartments for senior citizens
West High School (Columbus, Ohio)
West High School (Jackson, Tennessee), abolished in 1992 and merged with South Side High School (Jackson, Tennessee)
West High School (Knoxville, Tennessee)
West High School (Texas), West, Texas
West High School (Utah), Salt Lake City, Utah

Schools with variant names in the United States
Appleton West High School, Appleton, Wisconsin
Bellevue West High School, Bellevue, Nebraska
Billings West High School, Billings, Montana
Blue Valley West High School, Overland Park, Kansas
Central Bucks High School West, Doylestown, Pennsylvania
Davenport West High School, Davenport, Iowa
Glenbard West High School, Glen Ellyn, Illinois
Green Bay West High School, Green Bay, Wisconsin
Iowa City West High School, Iowa City, Iowa
Joliet West High School, Joliet, Illinois
Kenmore West Senior High School, Buffalo, New York
Lakota West High School, Cincinnati, Ohio
Lee's Summit West High School, Lee's Summit, Missouri
Lincoln-West High School, Cleveland, Ohio
Madison West High School, Madison, Wisconsin
Maine West High School, Des Plaines, Illinois
Manchester High School West, Manchester, New Hampshire
Merrill F. West High School, Tracy, California
Millard West High School, Omaha, Nebraska
Montreal West High School, Montreal, Quebec, Canada
Niles West High School, Skokie, Illinois
Oshkosh West High School, Oshkosh, Wisconsin
Parkway West High School (Ballwin, Missouri)
Plano West Senior High School, Plano, Texas
Pocono Mountain West High School, Pocono Summit, Pennsylvania
Traverse City West Senior High School, Traverse City, Michigan
Waukesha West High School, Waukesha, Wisconsin
Wauwatosa West High School, Wauwatosa, Wisconsin
West Anchorage High School, Anchorage, Alaska
West Aurora High School, Aurora, Illinois
West Bend West High School, West Bend, Wisconsin
West Windsor-Plainsboro High School North, Plainsboro Township, New Jersey
West Windsor-Plainsboro High School South, Princeton Junction, New Jersey
Wichita West High School, Wichita, Kansas
Wilson Magnet High School, formerly West High School, Rochester, New York
W. F. West High School, Chehalis, Washington

See also

West (disambiguation)
Western High School (disambiguation)
Westlake High School (disambiguation)
Westmount High School